van Wyk is a common Afrikaans surname, derived from the Dutch Van Wijk. Notable people with the surname include:

Abraham Erasmus van Wyk (born 1952), South African taxonomist
Ben-Erik van Wyk (born 1956), South African taxonomist
Arnold van Wyk (1916–1983), South African composer
Christopher van Wyk (1957–2014), South African writer
Coenie van Wyk (born 1988), South African rugby union player
D. J. Van Wyk (died 1902), a Member of the Cape House of Assembly for Riverdale
Diaan van Wyk (born 1981), South African cricketer
Hermanus van Wyk (1835–1905), Namibian tribal chief
Inke van Wyk (born 1971), South African field hockey player
Janine van Wyk (born 1987), South African association football player
Juandre van Wyk (born 1989), South African cricketer
Kruger van Wyk (born 1980), New Zealand cricketer
Lenert van Wyk (born 1989), South African cricketer
Morne van Wyk (born 1979), South African cricketer
N. P. van Wyk Louw (1906–1970), South African poet and playwright
Ruben Van Wyk (born 1976), Namibian footballer 

Surnames of Dutch origin
Afrikaans-language surnames